A kennel club (known as a kennel council or canine council in some countries) is an organization for canine affairs that concerns itself with the breeding, showing and promotion of more than one breed of dog. Kennel clubs became popular in the mid 19th century. All-encompassing kennel clubs are also referred to as 'all-breed clubs', although "all" means only those breeds that they have decided to recognize, and "breed"  means purebred dogs, not including dog hybrids and crossbreeds or mixed-breed dogs. A club that handles only one breed is known as a breed club.

Role
Kennel clubs maintain breed standards, record pedigrees, and issue the rules for conformation dog shows and trials and accreditation of judges. They often serve as registries, which are lists of adult purebred dogs and lists of litters of puppies born to purebred parents.  A kennel club manages all these aspects of the dog breeds it claims to represent, either directly or through its member bodies.

Today's kennel clubs specialize in working dogs or conformation show dogs. In today's parlance, dog clubs for mixed-breed dogs are gaining ground and are now sometimes categorized as kennel clubs. The original purpose of a kennel club, however, was the breeding and showing of conformation bench purebreds, and this remains the most widely accepted definition. Widely known kennel clubs such as The Kennel Club, the American Kennel Club, the United Kennel Club, and the Canadian Kennel Club each offer canine events and training programs as well as dog registration services.

History
By the mid-19th century, ownership of selectively bred dogs was common among the affluent throughout Europe.

Kennel clubs were founded from the necessity to bring order out of chaos to the sport of public competitive dog exhibitions.  The first dog show in England was held in 1859, which was a social affair held by English aristocrats to raise funds for charity. They grew in popularity over fourteen years and were held in a rather ad hoc manner.

In 1859, the first dog show society came into existence in Birmingham, England.  Within three years, the  held the first dog show on the European continent in Paris, exhibiting a range of breeds, although the definition of guarding a breed remained open to interpretation.

Recognizing the necessity for the establishment of a governing body with punitive powers, MP Sewallis Shirley, called a group of well-known fanciers together and The Kennel Club was formed. In April 1873 a small group of people had a meeting in a three-roomed flat, which led later that year to the Kennel Club's first show at The Crystal Palace with 975 entrants.

The first general meeting of the Kennel Club took place in Birmingham's Great Western Hotel in December 1874.  During the same year, one of the first important actions of the club was to publish a stud book, which contained the pedigrees of 4,027 dogs that had won prizes at shows in the previous fourteen years. Rules were formed and classifications established.

In 1881, the French Société Centrale Canine was founded, followed by the Italian Ente Nazionale della Cinofilia Italiana (ENCI) in 1882, and the American Kennel Club in 1884.  The United Kennel Club was established in 1898. The Fédération Cynologique Internationale was formed in 1911, under the auspices of the Austrian, Belgian, Dutch, French and German canine societies. The new kennel club rules reflected that pedigrees must be registered with their respective club.

Clubs acted as a court of appeal to set and maintain standards. They successfully popularized the sport of dog showing and elevated it from venues such as bars and public houses to fashionable locations. Through a kennel club, people could obtain pedigrees for their dogs, which were included on permanent registers.  Kennel clubs have had more influence on the development of dog breeds than any other factor since the original diversification of dogs according to function.

International kennel clubs
Nations that have active groups of dog breeders and people who practice the hobby of dog fancy usually have their own national kennel clubs, often affiliated with those of other countries.  Most kennel clubs have reciprocal arrangements and dogs registered in one country can be re-registered in another country if the dog is imported.

The Fédération Cynologique Internationale represents over eighty countries and has ties to many countries' major kennel clubs.  There may be reciprocal agreements or understandings between affiliate members of the FCI.

See also

 Conformation show
 Kennel
 List of kennel clubs
 Dogs portal

References